Point Lookout, a mountain on the Snowy Range, a spur of the Great Dividing Range, is located in the New England National Park on the eastern edge of the Northern Tablelands in the New England region of New South Wales, Australia.

During cold spells the mountain may receive a light dusting of snow.

Description

Point Lookout is also the name of the main visitor location in the New England National Park. The lookouts have views east across the Bellinger River valley, out to the more developed areas of the north coast of New South Wales and the Tasman Sea on a clear day.

On the escarpment only 10 minutes walk south is Banksia Point. There are a number of cabins and a hut here. These are available from the National Parks and Wildlife Service for short term stays in the park.

See also

 List of mountains of New South Wales

References

New England (New South Wales)
Mountains of New South Wales
Northern Tablelands